Maria is a 1995 album by Canadian singer and songwriter Jane Siberry. It was her first album not to include any musical contributions from longtime collaborators such as Ken Myhr and Rebecca Jenkins.

Information
The album ends with "Oh My My," a 20 minute-plus ode that gathers the themes from the entire album. Rolling Stone wrote: "[I]n this heap of Siberjazz you realize that everything that has arisen on Maria has indeed converged and that you've actually been led on an unforgettable walk in a garden facing fall with a tour guide who's sure-footed in her wobbly pace. Awesome."

Maria was her last major label album. In 1996, Siberry started her own independent record label, Sheeba Records, and has released all of her subsequent recordings on that imprint.

Reception

Rolling Stone wrote about Maria:
"[H]ot damn, the girl's back in the driver's seat with Maria...This is vintage Siberry: scissor-kicking around the soul's messiest spots in search of anything hinting toward redemption... That's exactly what this album's about: the pull of life. Not specifically the good or the bad or the ugly but just the pull and the subsequent release."

Track listing
All songs by Siberry, except "Would You Go?" by Siberry and Tim Ray.

"Maria" (4:25)
"See the Child" (6:24)
"Honey Bee" (4:17)
"Caravan" (7:30)
"Lovin' Cup" (3:39)
"Begat Begat" (6:33)
"Goodbye Sweet Pumpkinhead" (4:35)
"Would You Go?" (7:20)
"Mary Had a Little Lamb" (1:58)
"Oh My My" (20:15)

Personnel
Jane Siberry - vocals, guitar, lyrics, producer

with
Tim Ray - piano
Brian Blade - drums
Christopher Thomas - double bass
David Travers-Smith - trumpet
Ian McLauchlan - percussion
Ritesh Das - tabla
George Koller - sitar, esraj
Cullen Singers

and
David Travers-Smith - recording engineer
Jeff Elliot - assistant engineer
Ormond Jobim - co-engineer
Michael Brooke - mixes
Gregory Calbi - mastering
Frank Ockenfels 3 - colour photos
Trevor Hughes - studio photos
Say-Lay-Pho - artwork design
Wyatt Mitchell - design co-ordination

References

1995 albums
Jane Siberry albums
Reprise Records albums